Rosanna Huffman (August 12, 1938 – May 20, 2016) was an American actress and voiceover artist. Huffman's film credits as a voice actress included Oliver & Company in 1988, The Fabulous Baker Boys in 1989, FernGully: The Last Rainforest in 1992, and Babe in 1995. She also appeared in recurring roles in Murder, She Wrote, Hill Street Blues, and Murder One. Huffman was the widow of Richard Levinson, the co-creator of Columbo and Murder, She Wrote, who died of a heart attack in 1987.

Huffman was born to Doras and Christine Huffman on August 12, 1938, in Timblin, Pennsylvania, a small coal mining town. She moved to New York in the 1960s and was quickly cast in a lead role in the 1965 Broadway production of Half a Sixpence.

She met Richard Levinson while attending a party. The couple married in 1969 and moved to Los Angeles, where Huffman soon won a lead role in a musical comedy, Jane Heights. Later, during the 1970s, she guest-starred in two episodes of Columbo, including the episode "Suitable for Framing" (1971) in which she was cast as the partner of a murderous art critic portrayed by Ross Martin. Huffman also appeared in seven episodes of Murder, She Wrote, another series created by Levinson over the course of a decade. Additionally, she was cast in a recurring role on Hill Street Blues, playing the former wife of Joe Spano's character, Lt. Henry Goldblume. Her other television credits, spanning from the 1960s to the 2000s, include the series The Big Valley, Mission: Impossible, Ellery Queen, The Streets of San Francisco, Barnaby Jones, The Golden Girls, Family Ties, Cagney & Lacey, and ER.

Rosanna Huffman died from pancreatic cancer at her home in Santa Monica, California, on May 20, 2016, at the age of 77. She was survived by her daughter Chrissy and two grandchildren.

Filmography

References

External links

1938 births
2016 deaths
American film actresses
American stage actresses
American television actresses
American voice actresses
Actresses from Santa Monica, California
Actresses from Pennsylvania
Burials at Westwood Village Memorial Park Cemetery
20th-century American actresses
21st-century American actresses
Deaths from cancer in California
Deaths from pancreatic cancer